Hit That Jive, Jack! is the second studio album led by jazz guitarist and singer John Pizzarelli, released in 1985 with Stash Records.

Track listing

Personnel
 John Pizzarelliarranger, composer, guitar, primary artist, vocals
 Bucky Pizzarelliguest artist, guitar, primary artist, producer
 Bernard Brightmanexecutive producer
 Dave McKennaguest artist, piano
 Jerry Brunobass
 Gary Haasebass
 Steve Ferreradrums
 Butch Milesdrums
 Hugh McCrackenharmonica

Support
 Richard AblesA&R
 Will Friedwaldliner notes
 Collin Kelloggart direction
 Alice Melzerphotography
 Gary Posnerengineer

Reception

Scott Yanow's review for AllMusic was mixed, commenting that "Pizzarelli's singing was already distinctive and his guitar playing quite swinging, but roughly half of the songs on this CD reissue use pop or funk rhythms" on account of him "not quite [finding] his niche yet". He concluded "the uneven material and arrangements make this a lightweight effort."

References

Bibliography

 

John Pizzarelli albums
1985 albums
Albums produced by Bernard Brightman